Bedingham is a village and civil parish in the South Norfolk district of Norfolk, England, about 11 miles (18 km) south of Norwich.  According to the 2001 census it had a population of 216, increasing to 221 at the 2011 census.

The villages name means 'Homestead/village of Beda's people'.

The church of Bedingham St Andrew is one of 124 existing round-tower churches in Norfolk.

War Memorial
Bedingham's War Memorial takes the form of a stone Celtic cross memorial in St. Andrew's Churchyard. It holds the following names for the First World War:
 Corporal Frederick J. Jarvis (1897-1918), 1st Battalion, Royal Berkshire Regiment
 Gunner George H. Green (1893-1915), 1st Battery, Royal Australian Artillery
 Gunner George Everett (1879-1916), HMS Lion
 Private George J. Alexander (1872-1917), Royal Army Veterinary Corps
 Private George K. Tippell (1896-1915), 1st Battalion, Essex Regiment
 Private George Yallop (1887-1917), 104th Company, Labour Corps
 Private Charles A. Legood (1882-1918), 490th Company, Labour Corps
 Private Austin L. Everett (1897-1916), 1st Battalion, Royal Norfolk Regiment
 Private Walter Roper (1884-1914), 1st Battalion, Royal Norfolk Regiment
 Private William P. Fisk (1882-1915), 7th Battalion, Royal Norfolk Regiment
 Private Albert Wright (1876-1919), Garrison Battalion, Royal Norfolk Regiment
 Private Albert T. Tippell (1891-1917), 1st Battalion, Northamptonshire Regiment
 Private Frederick W. Quantrill (1894-1917), H Battalion, Tank Corps

And, the following for the Second World War:
 Sergeant Ronald E. Elvin (1923-1943), No. 21 Operational Training Unit

References

External links

Website with photos of Bedingham St Andrew, a round-tower church
 https://web.archive.org/web/20080828222324/http://www.south-norfolk.gov.uk/democracy/bedingham_parish.asp

Villages in Norfolk
Civil parishes in Norfolk